Comezzano-Cizzago is a town and comune in the province of Brescia, in Lombardy.

References

Cities and towns in Lombardy